Halbreich is a surname. Notable people with the surname include:

Betty Halbreich (born 1927), American personal shopper, stylist, and author
Harry Halbreich (1931–2016), Belgian musicologist
Kathy Halbreich (born 1949), American art curator and museum director